Khuri may refer:

Places
 Khuri, Iran, a village in Kerman Province, Iran
 Khuri Bari, a village in Sikar district in Rajasthan state in India
 Khuri Chhoti, a village in Sikar district in Rajasthan state in India
 Khuri Chhoti, a village in Jaipur Division  in Rajasthan state in India

People
 Elizabeth Khuri, co-founder of social website Goodreads
 Fadlo R. Khuri, Former chair at Emory University School of Medicine
 Fuad Khuri, Lebanese anthropologist
 Philip Khuri Hitti, Historian and professor at Harvard University
 Yusuf Al-Khuri, ancient translator and mathematician

Others
 Khuri language, one of the Central Iranian varieties of Iran

See also 
 Khouri, a surname